Ana Fani Alessandri Carlos is a Brazilian geographer. She is a full professor  at the Department of Geography at the University of São Paulo and coordinator of the São Paulo Study Group. Carlos focuses her research on the São Paulo metropolitan area and the spatial transformations which resulted from the area's development.

Published books (in Portuguese) 
 Espaço e indústria. São Paulo: Editora Contexto/Edusp, 1ª edição 1992, 4a edição 1992., 5 edição 1995, 7ª edição 1997, 70 p.
 Os Caminhos da Reflexão Sobre a Cidade e o Urbano. Edusp, 1994, 391 p.
 A cidade, São Paulo: Editora Contexto, 1ª edição 1991, 2ª edição 1995. (Coleção Repensando a Geografia), 98 p.
 A (re)produção do espaço urbano. São Paulo: Editora da Universidade de São Paulo, 1994, 270 p.
 O lugar no/do mundo. São Paulo: Hucitec, 1996, 150 p. segunda edição no prelo 
 Espaço - tempo na metrópole Editora Contexto, São Paulo, 2001 368 páginas.
 Geografias de São Paulo. Editora Contexto Ana Fani Alessandri Carlos e Ariovaldo Umbelino de Oliveira, 2004, 828 p

References 

Brazilian geographers
Living people
Year of birth missing (living people)
Academic staff of the University of São Paulo
Women geographers